Farha Khatun is an Indian editor and documentary filmmaker known for directing the documentary Holy Rights which won Best Film on Social Issues at the 67th National Film Awards.

She also Co-directed the Documentary I am Bonnie which also  won Best Film on Social Issues  at 65th National Film Awards.

Filmography

Awards

I am Bonnie 

 National Film Award For Best Film On Social Issue.
 Special Jury Mention' at Mumbai International Film Festival (MIFF)
 ‘Best Documentary’ at Kolkata International Film Festival

Holy Rights 

 National Film Award For Best Film On Social Issue.

References

External links 
 

Indian film award winners
Indian documentary film directors
Year of birth missing (living people)
Living people